Lemyra neglecta is a moth of the family Erebidae. It was described by Walter Rothschild in 1910. It is found in India (Sikkim, Assam, Darjiling), Nepal, Myanmar and China (Tibet, Yunnan).

References

 

neglecta
Moths described in 1910